
Year 436 (CDXXXVI) was a leap year starting on Wednesday (link will display the full calendar) of the Julian calendar. At the time, it was known as the Year of the Consulship of Isodorus and Senator (or, less frequently, year 1189 Ab urbe condita). The denomination 436 for this year has been used since the early medieval period, when the Anno Domini calendar era became the prevalent method in Europe for naming years.

Events 
 By place 

 Europe 
 Flavius Aetius, Roman general (magister militum), attempts to put an end to Burgundian raids in Gaul. He calls in Hun mercenaries under command of Attila and his brother Bleda, which plunder Augusta Vangionum, killing some 20,000 Burgundians. The Kingdom of the Burgundians is destroyed; King Gunther and his family are killed (this epic disaster will later provide the source for the Nibelungenlied).    
 King Theodoric I besieges the city of Narbonne; the Visigoths obtain access to the Mediterranean Sea and the roads to the Pyrenees.

 By topic 

 Religion 
 The Buddhist Srimala Sutra is translated into Chinese by Gunabhadra.

Births 
 Zangloo Zhenfeng, empress of the Liu Song dynasty (d. 479)

Deaths 
 April 9 – Tan Daoji, general of the Liu Song dynasty
 Chu Lingyuan, last empress of the Jin dynasty (b. 384)
 Gunther, king of the Burgundians (approximate date)

References